Pen Densham (born 14 October 1947) is a British-Canadian film and television producer, writer, and director, known for writing and producing films such as Robin Hood: Prince of Thieves and television revivals of The Outer Limits and The Twilight Zone, as well as writing, producing and directing MGM's Moll Flanders.

Early life
Born in England in 1947 to Raymond Densham who worked in the British film industry, Pen left school at age 15 and was hired by British TV to photograph The Rolling Stones to sell to national magazines.  At 19 he moved to Canada where he directed commercials and documentaries, working with Marshall McLuhan.

Densham went on to found Insight Productions in Toronto with John Watson.  The company gained recognition for documentaries such as Life Times Nine, one of two Insight films that earned Academy Award nominations.  In total, Densham and Watson received over 70 international awards for their works including medals from the Queen of the United Kingdom for their contribution to the Arts of Canada.  The first drama Densham wrote and directed, If Wishes Were Horses, won 14 awards, was reviewed by TV guide as "The best film of any length shown on Canadian TV", and brought Densham's work to the attention of Norman Jewison. Jewison, with Telefilm Canada, sponsored Densham to move to Hollywood.

Career

Trilogy Entertainment Group
In Hollywood Densham and Watson founded Trilogy Entertainment Group. They were employed as creative consultants on films such as Rocky II and Footloose.  In 1988 Densham directed Trilogy's first studio feature, The Kiss, for Tri-Star. In 1990 Densham re-envisioned the Robin Hood story, creating a new characterization and adding new concepts.  Densham and Watson sold their spec script for Robin Hood: Prince of Thieves and produced the film for Morgan Creek Productions and Warner Brothers.  The film became one of Warner Brothers' largest grossing movies ever, spinning off games, toy lines and the No. 1 music single from Bryan Adams, "(Everything I Do) I Do It for You". In the same year they were producers on Backdraft with Ron Howard directing for Imagine Entertainment and Universal Pictures.  Backdraft generated one of the longest-lasting attractions at the Universal Studios Tour.

Inspired by the loss of his mother, Densham wrote and directed a personal version of Moll Flanders for MGM and Spelling Entertainment, based loosely on the novel by Daniel Defoe, starring Morgan Freeman and Robin Wright.  Densham also wrote and directed Houdini, an $8 million TNT feature for television starring Johnathon Schaech, Mark Ruffalo and Emile Hirsch. In 1992, Trilogy Entertainment Group jumped into its television foray by signing it with RHI Entertainment, with potential off-net syndication rights handled by Columbia Pictures Television.

In television Densham wrote and supervised the re-franchising of The Outer Limits science fiction anthology series, which he executive-produced with his partners for its award-winning seven-year-run on American television. In the process Densham earned the unique distinction of being named number eight in the 50 Most Powerful People in Science Fiction list compiled by Cinefantastique magazine.  In 2003 he re-introduced The Twilight Zone fantasy anthology series to American audiences on UPN.

Emergence as an author

Densham became a published author with his book about screenplay writing and selling creativity in Hollywood, Riding the Alligator: Strategies for a Career in Screenplay Writing (And Not Getting Eaten), published by Michael Wiese Books in January 2011. The title comes from the cover photo of Densham at the age of four astride a live seven-foot alligator in one of his parents' theatrical short films. Written with the goal of supporting emerging creative people finding their own voice and path through the Hollywood industry as well as artistic endeavors in general, the book includes supportive essays by professional screenwriters Shane Black, Nia Vardalos, Andrea Berloff, Eric Roth, John Watson, Robin Swicord, Todd Robinson, Alan McElroy, Anthony Peckham, Ron Shelton and Laeta Kalogridis. The book received positive reviews from Academy Award-winning writer-director-producers like Paul Haggis and Ron Howard, as well as actors like Jeff Bridges, Morgan Freeman, Robin Wright and Emile Hirsch.

Filmography

Film

Television

Books

Why We Write (contribution) – 1999
Riding the Alligator: Strategies for a Career in Screenplay Writing – 2011

Awards and nominations

Academy Awards 

 1974 Academy Award for Best Live Action Short Film: Life Times Nine (nominated) – with John Watson
 1981 Academy Award for Best Documentary (Short Subject): Don't Mess with Bill (nominated) – with John Watson

CableACE Award 

 1995 CableACE Award for Best Dramatic Series: The Outer Limits (nominated) – with Richard B. Lewis & John Watson

Fantasporto Fantasy Film Festival 

 1990 Fantasporto International Fantasy Film Award: The Kiss (nominated)

Gemini Awards 

 1996 Gemini Award for Best TV Movie or Mini-Series: The Outer Limits (nominated) – with Richard B. Lewis, John Watson, Justis Greene & James Nadler
 1997 Gemini Award for Best Short Dramatic Program: The Outer Limits (nominated) – with James Nadler, Richard B. Lewis, Brad Wright, Brent-Karl Clackson & John Watson
 1998 Gemini Award for Best Dramatic Series: The Outer Limits (nominated) – James Nadler, Richard B. Lewis, Brad Wright, Brent-Karl Clackson, John Watson, Jonathan Glassner & Sam Egan
 2000 Gemini Award for Best Dramatic Series: The Outer Limits (nominated) – Richard B. Lewis, Brent-Karl Clackson, John Watson & Sam Egan
 2001 Gemini Award for Best Dramatic Series: The Outer Limits (nominated) – Richard B. Lewis, Mark Stern, Brent-Karl Clackson, John Watson & Sam Egan

References

External links

Canadian Film Centre profile
Schoos Gallery profile
Riding the Alligator: Strategies For a Career in Screenplay Writing

Living people
1947 births
British film producers
Canadian film producers
English television writers
English screenwriters
English male screenwriters
Canadian male screenwriters
Screenwriting instructors
20th-century Canadian screenwriters
21st-century Canadian screenwriters
British male television writers